Kelechi Promise Iheanacho (spelled Ịheanachọ in Igbo) (born 3 October 1996) is a Nigerian professional footballer who plays as a forward for  club Leicester City and the Nigeria national team.

Iheanacho began his senior career at Manchester City during the 2015–16 season. He moved to Leicester City in 2017 for a reported £25 million fee.

Iheanacho was part of the Nigeria squad that won the 2013 FIFA U-17 World Cup and the Nigeria U-20 team at the 2015 FIFA U-20 World Cup. He made his senior debut for Nigeria in 2015, and played at the 2018 FIFA World Cup and 2021 Africa Cup of Nations.

Club career

Manchester City

Early career

Iheanacho was born in Owerri, Imo State. As a youth, he represented Taye Academy in Owerri, the capital city of Imo. His performances for Nigeria in the 2013 FIFA U-17 World Cup led to interest from clubs in Europe; teams following his progress included Arsenal, Sporting CP and Porto. In December 2012, Iheanacho travelled to England to discuss a move to Manchester City. He signed a pre-contract agreement with the club, stating his intent to formally sign for City on his 18th birthday in October 2014. In the interim, he returned to Nigeria. As the year drew to a close, the Confederation of African Football (CAF) named him the Most Promising Talent of the Year for 2013 at the CAF Awards.

Iheanacho joined Manchester City's Academy on 10 January 2015. Before the 2014–15 season, City visited the United States on a pre-season tour, and although still not formally a City player, he joined up with the squad. He played and scored in the first match of the tour, a 4–1 win against Sporting Kansas City, and scored again against Milan in a 5–1 win. After the conclusion of the tour, Manchester City arranged for Iheanacho to train with the Columbus Crew until mid-October.

Delays in obtaining a work permit meant Iheanacho was unable to play in England until February 2015. He made his debut at under-19 level in a UEFA Youth League match against Schalke 04, but sustained an injury after only 11 minutes. After his recovery, he began to represent Manchester City at both youth and under-21 level in the latter part of the season. He played in the FA Youth Cup final, where he scored, but ended on the losing side after Chelsea claimed a 5–2 aggregate victory. The following week, he scored the only goal as Manchester City beat Porto in the final of the 2014–15 Premier League International Cup.

2015–16 season
In July 2015, Iheanacho was included in City's pre-season tour team in Australia. On the tour, he set up the first goal for Raheem Sterling and scored the second goal in the win against Roma in the 2015 International Champions Cup. He also set up Sterling for the fourth goal in City's 8–1 victory against the Vietnam national team. In City's last preseason game, against VfB Stuttgart, he came on as a substitute, scoring late on in a 4–2 defeat. Due to his impressive pre-season, Iheanacho was promoted to the Manchester City senior squad.

On 10 August 2015, Iheanacho was included in a first-team matchday squad for the first time in a competitive fixture, however he remained an unused substitute in their 3–0 win at West Bromwich Albion in their first game of the Premier League season. Nineteen days later, he made his competitive debut, replacing Raheem Sterling for the final minute of a 2–0 win against Watford at the City of Manchester Stadium. He scored his first competitive goal on 12 September, replacing Wilfried Bony in the final minute in a match away to Crystal Palace and scoring the only goal of the game.

Iheanacho scored his first career hat-trick on 30 January 2016 against Aston Villa in the fourth round of the FA Cup, also setting up City's fourth goal, scored by Raheem Sterling. The following month, he was put in City's UEFA Champions League squad at the expense of the injured Samir Nasri. During February, Iheanacho scored against Tottenham Hotspur in a 2–1 home defeat for City.

Iheanacho's next goals came on 23 April 2016, where he scored twice against Stoke City in a 4–0 victory. He followed this up with a Champions League semi-final substitute appearance on 26 April 2016. Five days later, on 1 May 2016, he scored two again, albeit in a 4–2 defeat at the hands of Southampton.

 Iheanacho ended the 2015–16 season with eight Premier League goals and had the best goals-per-minute ratio of any player, averaging a goal every 93.9 minutes. In all competitions he finished with a record of 14 goals and 5 assists from 35 appearances, although he only started 11 of these games. His goals total also meant he ended the season as City's third-highest scorer.

2016–17 season
On 10 September 2016, Iheanacho started in the Manchester derby. He recorded an assist and his first goal of the season in a 2–1 win for City. Four days later, Iheanacho came off the bench to score the final goal in City's 4–0 home win in the Champions League, against Borussia Mönchengladbach. This was his first European goal for Manchester City. Three days after the 4–0 win, Iheanacho scored the second goal, also assisting the third, in City's game against AFC Bournemouth. That goal took his tally in the Premier League to 10, allowing him to join an exclusive list of players to have scored 10 Premier League goals before the age of 20. This list includes players such as Wayne Rooney, Ryan Giggs, Nicolas Anelka, Michael Owen and Romelu Lukaku.

In October 2016, Iheanacho was nominated for the FIFA Golden Boy award, which was eventually won by Bayern Munich's midfielder Renato Sanches. Previous winners of the award include teammates Raheem Sterling and Sergio Agüero, and six-time Ballon d'Or winner Lionel Messi.

Iheanacho's next goal would come in the Champions League, against Celtic, in a 1–1 home draw on 6 December 2016. Iheanacho's final goal of the season, and subsequently final goal for City, came against Huddersfield in a 5–1 FA Cup fifth round replay win, in which Iheanacho scored the final goal of the game.

Leicester City

2017–2020
Iheanacho was signed by Premier League club Leicester City on a five-year contract on 3 August 2017, for a reported £25 million fee. He made his debut for the club in a 4–3 defeat to Arsenal on 11 August 2017. He scored his first goal for Leicester in an EFL Cup tie against Leeds United on 24 October 2017. On 16 January 2018, Iheanacho became the first player in English football to be awarded a goal due to VAR, as the referee deemed that the player had been incorrectly ruled offside for his second goal. The goal was Iheanacho's second in a 2–0 win over Fleetwood Town in the FA Cup Third Round replay.

2020–21 season
Iheanacho wasn't in the first-choice starting eleven at the start of the season, and only started two of Leicester's first 21 Premier League games. However, several injuries to key players meant that Iheanacho got an extended run of games. Iheanacho then went on a goalscoring run of 12 goals in 10 games in all competitions during March and April.

Iheanacho scored his first Premier League hat-trick in a 5–0 win against Sheffield United on 14 March 2021. A week later, Iheanacho netted a brace in Leicester's 3–1 win over Manchester United in the quarter-finals of the FA Cup, sending the club into the semi-finals of the competition for the first time since 1981–82. The two strikes were Iheanacho's eighth and ninth goals in his last nine matches in all competitions. Iheanacho won the Premier League Player of the Month award in March 2021 after scoring five goals in three league appearances.

On 3 April, Iheanacho signed a new three-year contract with Leicester, keeping him at the club until at least 2024. On 18 April, Iheanacho scored the only goal in a 1–0 win over Southampton in the FA Cup semi-final at Wembley Stadium. The win took the Foxes to their first FA Cup final since 1969.

2021–22 season
Iheanacho and Leicester started the 2021–22 season with the 2021 FA Community Shield against Manchester City. Iheanacho was substituted on during the 79th minute and scored the winning goal, an 89th-minute penalty against his former club.

International career

Iheanacho has represented Nigeria at youth levels from under-13 upwards. His first experience of a major international tournament was the 2013 African U-17 Championship in Morocco. For Iheanacho, the highlight was a hat-trick in a win against Botswana. He dedicated his goals to his mother, who died two months before the tournament. Nigeria reached the final of the competition, where they were defeated on penalties by the Ivory Coast.

Iheanacho played a significant role in the 2013 FIFA U-17 World Cup, where he won the Golden Ball award for player of the tournament. Nigeria won the competition, in which Iheanacho scored six times, including once in the final, and provided seven assists. In the run-up to the 2014 African Nations Championship, Iheanacho trained with the senior Nigeria squad but was released from the squad in order to travel to England to sign with Manchester City. He was part of the Nigeria squad for the 2015 FIFA U-20 World Cup in New Zealand, and featured in two matches.

He was selected by Nigeria for their 35-man provisional squad for the 2016 Summer Olympics, but failed to make the final 18.

Iheanacho made his senior debut as a substitute in a 2018 FIFA World Cup qualifying match against Eswatini in which Nigeria drew 0–0. His first start for the senior team was on 25 March 2016, a 1–1 draw with Egypt in a 2017 Africa Cup of Nations qualifying match.

Iheanacho was selected by Nigeria in friendly games against Mali and Luxembourg in May 2016. He scored in the two games, providing an assist against Luxembourg.

His performance in the friendly matches inspired further confidence within football circles in the nation and was invited to make his competitive debut against Egypt in an African Cup of Nations qualifying series where he provided an assist for Oghenekaro Etebo in the home game.

Despite the change made in the coaching personnel in August this year, he distinguished himself again as one of the most important players in the team when he scored two superb goals in the two matches against Tanzania in Uyo and Zambia in Ndola.

In May 2018 he was named in Nigeria's preliminary 30-man squad for the 2018 World Cup in Russia.

On 25 December 2021, Iheanacho was shortlisted in Nigeria's 2021 Africa Cup of Nations 28-man squad by caretaker coach Austin Eguavoen. He scored Nigeria's first goal of the tournament in the 30th minute of their opening match victory against Egypt.

Personal life
Iheanacho is from the Igbo ethnic group of Nigeria.

Career statistics

Club

International

Nigeria score listed first, score column indicates score after each Iheanacho goal

Honours
Manchester City
Football League Cup: 2015–16

Leicester City
FA Cup: 2020–21
FA Community Shield: 2021

Nigeria U17
FIFA U-17 World Cup: 2013

Individual
FIFA U-17 World Cup Golden Ball: 2013
CAF Most Promising Talent of the Year: 2013, 2016
CAF Team of the Year: 2016 (as a substitute)
FIFA U-17 World Cup Silver Shoe: 2013
CAF U-17 African Championship Silver Shoe: 2013
Premier League Player of the Month: March 2021

References

External links

Kelechi Iheanacho at the Leicester City F.C. website

1996 births
Living people
People from Owerri
Sportspeople from Imo State
Nigerian footballers
Association football forwards
Manchester City F.C. players
Leicester City F.C. players
Premier League players
FA Cup Final players
Nigeria youth international footballers
Nigeria under-20 international footballers
Nigeria international footballers
2018 FIFA World Cup players
2021 Africa Cup of Nations players
Nigerian expatriate footballers
Expatriate footballers in England
Nigerian expatriate sportspeople in England
Nigerian Christians
Igbo sportspeople